Hormurus karschii is a species of scorpion belonging to the family Hormuridae.

Description
Carapace is brown or dark brown, while tergites, legs, ventral surface and sternites are yellowish brown. Some specimens may be blackish brown or almost completely black.

Distribution 
This species is present in Australia (Queensland) and New Guinea.

Habitat

References

External links
 

Animals described in 1885
karschii
Arthropods of New Guinea
Scorpions of Australia
Taxa named by Eugen von Keyserling